George VI Sound or Canal Jorge VI or Canal Presidente Sarmiento or Canal Seaver or King George VI Sound or King George the Sixth Sound is a major bay/fault depression, 300 miles (483 km) long and mainly covered by a permanent ice shelf. It is in the shape of the letter J without any upper bar. It lines the east and south shores of Alexander Island, separating it from the vestigial, quite small, Wordie Ice Shelf and Palmer Land (the south-west of the Antarctic Peninsula) and the north-facing "English Coast".

Various lakes adjoin; these receive large amounts of melt ice from the George VI Ice Shelf. These include Hodgson, Moutonee and Ablation Lakes. Several glaciers flow eastward into the sound from the east interior of Alexander Island, the vast majority of these glaciers are south of Planet Heights, where all of these glaciers are named after moons, satellites and planets of the Solar System in the same vein as the Heights, named by the United Kingdom Antarctic Place-Names Committee (UK-APC) in 1977.

The sound is largely covered by the George VI Ice Shelf. Ice varies from about 15 miles (24 km) to more than 40 miles (64 km) wide. George VI Sound was discovered by Lincoln Ellsworth who flew over it in 1935. The sound was explored by the British Graham Land Expedition (BGLE) in 1936–37 and by the United States Antarctic Service (USAS) in 1940. The sound was named by John Riddoch Rymill, leader of the BGLE, for George VI, King of the United Kingdom and last Emperor of India.

The McLaughlin Cliffs overlook George VI Sound between Armstrong Glacier and Conchie Glacier.

Further reading 
 A. C. Bell, E. C. King, New seismic data support Cenozoic rifting in George VI Sound, Antarctic Peninsula, Geophysical Journal International, Volume 134, Issue 3, September 1998, Pages 889–902, https://doi.org/10.1046/j.1365-246x.1998.00605.x
 J.R.Potter, M.H.Talbot, J.G.Paren, Oceanic regimes at the ice fronts of George VI Sound, Antarctic Peninsula, Continental Shelf Research Volume 8, Issue 4, April 1988, Pages 347–362, https://doi.org/10.1016/0278-4343(88)90008-8
 D. E. Sugden, C. M. Clapperton, An Ice-shelf Moraine, George VI Sound, Antarctica, Continental Shelf Research Volume 8, Issue 4, April 1988, Pages 347–362, https://doi.org/10.1016/0278-4343(88)90008-8
 Clapperton, C., & Sugden, D. (1982), Glacier Fluctuations in George VI Sound Area, West Antarctica, Annals of Glaciology, 3, 345-345. .3189/S0260305500003165
 Crabtree, R.D. & Storey, B.C. & Doake, C.S.M., (1985), The structural evolution of George VI Sound, Antarctic Peninsula , Tectonophysics. 114. 431–442. .1016/0040-1951(85)90025-3
  International Symposium on Antarctic Earth Sciences 5th : 1987 : Cambridge, England, Geological Evolution of Antarctica, P 527
 Defense Mapping Agency  1992, Sailing Directions (planning Guide) and (enroute) for Antarctica, P 377

External links 

 George VI Sound on USGS website
 George VI Sound on SCAR website
 George VI Sound depth
 George VI Sound updated long term weather forecast

References

Bodies of water of Palmer Land
Depressions (geology)
Bodies of water of Alexander Island